"Anecdote of the Jar" is a poem from Wallace Stevens's first book of poetry, Harmonium. First published  in 1919, it is in the public domain.

Interpretation
Wallace Stevens wrote the poem in 1918 when he was in the town of Elizabethton, Tennessee. This much-anthologized poem succinctly accommodates a remarkable number of different and plausible interpretations, as Jacqueline Brogan observes in a discussion of how she teaches it to her students. It can be approached from a New Critical perspective as a poem about writing poetry and making art generally. From a poststructuralist perspective the poem is concerned with temporal and linguistic disjunction, especially in the convoluted syntax of the last two lines. A feminist perspective reveals a poem concerned with male dominance over a traditionally feminized landscape. A cultural critic might find a sense of industrial imperialism. Brogan concludes: "When the debate gets particularly intense, I introduce Roy Harvey Pearce's discovery of the Dominion canning jars (a picture of which is then passed around)."

Buttel suggests that the speaker would arrange the wild landscape into the order of a still life, and though his success is qualified, art and imagination do at least impose an idea of order on the sprawling reality.

Helen Vendler, in a reading that contradicts Brogan's and Buttel's, asserts that the poem is incomprehensible except as understood as a commentary on Keats's "Ode on a Grecian Urn". The poem alludes to Keats, she argues, as a way of discussing the predicament of the American artist "who cannot feel confidently the possessor, as Keats felt, of the Western cultural tradition." Shall he use language imported from Europe ("of a port in air", to "give of"), or "plain American that cats and dogs can read" (as Marianne Moore put it), like "The jar was round upon the ground"? The poem is a palinode, retracting the Keatsian conceits of "Sunday Morning" and vowing "to stop imitating Keats and seek a native American language that will not take the wild out of the wilderness."

Notes

References 
 Brogan, Jacqueline Vaught. "Introducing Stevens: Or, the Sheerly Playful and the Display of Theory." In Teaching Wallace Stevens, ed. John Serio and B. Leggett. 1994: University of Tennessee Press.
 Buttel, Robert. Wallace Stevens: The Making of Harmonium. 1967:  Princeton University Press.
 Vendler, Helen. Words Chosen Out of Desire. 1984: University of Tennessee Press.

Poetry by Wallace Stevens
American poems
1919 poems
Modernist poems